John was a Hungarian distinguished nobleman, who served as ban of Macsó in 1273, during the reign of Ladislaus IV of Hungary.

References

Sources
  Zsoldos, Attila (2011). Magyarország világi archontológiája, 1000–1301 ("Secular Archontology of Hungary, 1000–1301"). História, MTA Történettudományi Intézete. Budapest. 

Medieval Hungarian nobility
Bans of Macsó
13th-century Hungarian people 
Year of birth missing 
Year of death missing